Tako Taal is a Welsh-Gambian artist, filmmaker and programmer based in Glasgow, Scotland.  Her work looks at the social and psychic impact of colonialism. Her work has been reviewed in Art Monthly, the Scotsman, and Studio International.

Early life and education 
Tako Taal was born in Wales in 1989 with her family originating from Jufureh, in the Gambia. She attended Gray's School of Art in Aberdeen, studying contemporary art practice, and graduated in 2015. Taal was highly commended in the fine art category of her degree show, one of two people out of 150 undergraduates.

Practice 
Taal's films look at multiplicities of identity, and explore the social and historical significance of her father’s home, Jufureh, and myth-making about returning to places that no longer exist except in "topographies of grief and loss".

Career 
Taal was a committee member at the Market Gallery in Glasgow from 2016 to 2018. In 2018-2020, she was Artist in Residence at the Talbot Rice Gallery in Edinburgh, and in 2019, was RAW Academy fellow at RAW Material Company in Dakar.

Having not visited for 11 years, she travelled to the Gambia in 2016, and filmed at the Gambia Tourism and Hospitality Institute. This footage was incorporated into 2017's You Know it but it Don’t Know You.

Taal and fellow artist Adam Benmakhlouf programmed Give Birth to Me Tomorrow, the 2021 artists' moving image festival by LUX Scotland, held at the Tramway, in Glasgow. Originally planned to be a weekend event, but in response to the continued difficulties of the Covid-19 pandemic in the UK, it took place on several weekends throughout 2021, in a programme aligned with the lunar calendar.

At the shore, everything touches (2021) explored Taal's relationship with her father's home village, as well as the history of the area with relation to the Atlantic slave trade. (It is close to Kunta Kinteh Island (formerly known as James Island), a European (and later British) colonial fort.) Art Monthly described the work as establishing Taal "as among the most important multidisciplinary artists working today."  Halo Nevus (2021), also explores her relationship with her paternal home country through the use of her birthmark as central character; following its slow fade over a period of five years.

Taal was an associate artist at the 2021 Edinburgh Art Festival, commissioning six new pieces from other artists which would engage with the themes of Isaac Julien's 2019 film Lessons of the Hour. Pieces included work from Scotland-based artists Chizu Anucha, Sequoia Barnes, Thulani Rachia, and Matthew Arthur Williams. She also completed her residency at the Studio Pavilion in Glasgow, where she has been creating work for her first institutional solo show, launching at Dundee Contemporary Arts late 2021.

Selected exhibitions 

 2017 - Compound, Intermedia Gallery, Centre for Contemporary Arts, Glasgow
 2018 - Inherited Premises, Grand Union, Birmingham
 2019 - A Spoon is the Safest Vessel, Glasgow Women’s Library
 2020 - Survey II, Jerwood Arts
 2021 - At the shore, everything touches, Dundee Contemporary Arts

Awards 

 2021 - shortlisted for the Margaret Tait Award
 2021 - shortlisted for The Kleinwort Hambros Emerging Artist Prize

References 

Alumni of Gray's School of Art
Scottish artists
Welsh artists
Living people
Year of birth missing (living people)
Welsh film directors
Gambian art
Gambian film directors